Stavanger is an unincorporated community in Miller Township, LaSalle County, Illinois, United States.

Its namesake is the Norwegian city of Stavanger.

References

Unincorporated communities in LaSalle County, Illinois
Unincorporated communities in Illinois